Žan Benedičič (born 3 October 1995) is a Slovenian footballer who plays as an attacking midfielder for Slovenian PrvaLiga side Koper. He also represented Slovenia at various youth levels.

Club career

Milan
After progressing through the youth ranks at Milan, Benedičič broke into the Milan Primavera side. For the Primavera side in the 2013–14 season, Benedičič made 35 appearances in all competitions and scored 6 goals.

During the 2014–15 pre-season, he was called up to the Milan senior team for the tour of the United States by new Milan manager and his former youth coach Filippo Inzaghi, but on 29 July 2014, he flew home from the tour, strengthening speculation that he was preparing to sign on loan for Leeds United. On 30 July his agent Amir Ružnić confirmed Benedičič was close to a move to Leeds.

Loan to Leeds United
On 4 August 2014, it was confirmed that he had signed for Leeds United on a one-year loan deal, with the option for Leeds to buy at the end of the loan. Leeds head coach David Hockaday described Benedičič as "a versatile, strong and technical midfield player". He made his début for Leeds on 12 August when he came on as a substitute in the 63rd minute in a League Cup game against Accrington Stanley. Benedičič made his league début for Leeds United on 30 August in a 1–0 victory against Bolton Wanderers at Elland Road.

Shortly after making his debut, Benedičič picked up a knee injury with would rule him out for the season after he required knee surgery.

Return to Italy
After his loan spell expired at Leeds during the summer of 2015, he returned to Italy, signing for Como where he made nine appearances before signing for Ascoli, also making nine appearances.

Leyton Orient
On 19 September 2016, Benedičič joined Leyton Orient on a free transfer until January 2017. He left Orient in January after his contract was not renewed.

International career
Benedičič was capped for the Slovenia national under-21 football team, making his debut on 6 September 2013 against Russia U21. He scored his first goal on 19 November 2013 when he scored a goal in Slovenia U21s' 5–1 victory against Bulgaria U21.

Honours
Celje
Slovenian PrvaLiga: 2019–20

References

External links

NZS profile 

1995 births
Living people
Sportspeople from Kranj
Slovenian footballers
Slovenia youth international footballers
Slovenia under-21 international footballers
Association football midfielders
Slovenian expatriate footballers
Slovenian expatriate sportspeople in Italy
Expatriate footballers in Italy
Expatriate footballers in England
Slovenian expatriate sportspeople in England
A.C. Milan players
Leeds United F.C. players
Como 1907 players
Ascoli Calcio 1898 F.C. players
Leyton Orient F.C. players
Olbia Calcio 1905 players
NK Celje players
FC Koper players
English Football League players
Serie B players
Serie C players
Slovenian PrvaLiga players